Kasama Inari Shrine is one of the three largest Inari Okami shrines in Japan, having been awarded the ancient court rank of Senior First Grade. According to legends associated with the shrine, it was founded in 651 during the reign of Emperor Kotoku, indicating a history extending over some thirteen centuries.

During the Tokugawa or Edo period, Kasama Inari Shrine received the devoted patronage of the feudal lord of the Kasama Domain, and spread its influence not only through the Kantō region but throughout all of Japan. At present, the shrine is visited by more than 3.5 million pilgrims each year.

The shrine is dedicated to Ukanomitama no kami – a spirit with jurisdiction over the five grains and foodstuffs, the life-root kami having mastery over the sources of life itself. According to the oldest collection of Japanese mythology, the Kojiki ("Records of Ancient Matters"), Ukanomitama no kami was the child of Susano no okami and Kamuoichihime no kami. The "Uka" in the name means foodstuffs, indicating the "mysterious spirit dwelling in the grain".

References

External links

 Jinja Honcho – English – The Official Japanese Organization of 80,000 Shinto Shrines

Shinto shrines in Ibaraki Prefecture
Inari shrines
Religious buildings and structures completed in 1860
Kasama, Ibaraki
Beppyo shrines